Fritz Leandré (born 13 March 1948) is a Haitian football forward who played for Haiti in the 1974 FIFA World Cup. He also played for Racing CH. His older brother, Joseph-Marion, was also a professional player.

References

External links
FIFA profile

1948 births
Haitian footballers
Haiti international footballers
Association football forwards
Racing CH players
Ligue Haïtienne players
CONCACAF Championship-winning players
1974 FIFA World Cup players
Living people